Joel Wood (born 24 June 1984 in Sydney, Australia) is an Australian soccer player who plays for Maitland FC in the NNSW NPL. Besides Australia, he has played in Hong Kong.

Career

Earning a six-day trial with Fourway Athletic of the Hong Kong First Division League in summer 2008, Wood was unable to agree on terms with the club so assented to a season-long professional contract with Tuen Mun Progoal in September, scoring his only goal in a 4–2 win over Xiangxue Eisiti. '

In 2021, he left Valentine FC.

References

External links
 
 SportsTG Profile 
 

Association football forwards
1984 births
Newcastle Jets FC players
Australian expatriate soccer players
Australian expatriate sportspeople in Hong Kong
Parramatta FC players
Sydney Olympic FC players
Australian soccer players
Living people
Sportspeople from Newcastle, New South Wales
Soccer players from New South Wales
Broadmeadow Magic FC players
Expatriate footballers in Hong Kong
Valentine Phoenix FC players
Lake Macquarie City FC players
Edgeworth Eagles FC players